Trømborg is a small village in the municipality of Eidsberg, Norway. Its population (2019) is 263. Footballer Rune Buer Johansen began his career here.

References

Villages in Østfold